The Spanish ironclad Numancia was an armored frigate bought from France during the 1860s for service with the Royal Spanish Navy. The name was derived from the Siege of Numantia, in which Roman expansion in the Iberian Peninsula was resisted. She was the first ironclad to circumnavigate the Earth. She saw service in the Chincha Islands War and Cantonal Revolution.

Design and description

She displaced  and was fitted with a ram bow. Her crew consisted of 561 officers and enlisted men.

The ship was fitted with a pair of horizontal-return connecting-rod steam engines from her builder that drove one propeller shaft using steam provided by eight cylindrical boilers.

The frigate's main battery initially consisted of forty  smoothbore guns mounted on the broadside, but her armament was changed around 1867 to with six  and three 200 mm Armstrong-Whitworth guns, and eight Trubia  guns, all of which were rifled muzzle-loading (RML) weapons. The 229 mm and 160 mm guns were situated on the gun deck while the 200 mm guns were positioned on the main deck. In 1883 Numancia was rearmed with eight Armstrong-Whitworth  RML guns and seven 200 mm RMLs. When the ship was refitted in France in 1896–1898, her armament was changed to six Hontoria 160 mm and eight Canet  (real caliber 138.6 mm) rifled breech-loading guns and a pair of  torpedo tubes. According to other sources, main artillery was 6.5 inch guns (French caliber 164.7 mm)

Numancia had a complete wrought iron  waterline belt of  armor plates. Above the belt, the guns were protected by a  strake of armor that extended the length of the ship. The deck was unarmored.

Construction and career

In 1866 the ship was a core of Spanish escadre sent to Eastern Pacific participating in the Chincha Islands War, and shelling Valparaíso and Callao. On the way back she became the first ironclad to circumnavigate the Earth.

On 19 October 1873, during the Cantonal Revolution, Numancia collided with and sank the gunboat Fernando el Católico.

In November 1902 she was ordered to Ceuta to protect Spanish citizens in Morocco during unrest in that country.

On August 5, 1911 a mutiny occurred while in Tangiers. The mutineers were overpowered and put in irons after which the ship steamed for Cadiz. Once there 26 mutineers were tried by court martial and condemned to death. At 9 am on 8 August 1911 they were given communion and immediately executed.

While being towed to be scrapped in Bilbao she ran aground near Sesimbra, Portugal, during a gale on 17 December 1916 en route from Cadiz.

References

Bibliography
 
 
 

 

1863 ships
Ironclad warships of the Spanish Navy
Ships built in France
Maritime incidents in 1873
Chincha Islands War